Ella Jean Canfield, née Garrett (October 4, 1919 – December 31, 2000) was a Canadian politician. She was the first woman ever elected to the Legislative Assembly of Prince Edward Island, as well as the first woman to serve in the Executive Council of Prince Edward Island.

She was born in Westmoreland, Prince Edward Island, the daughter of Everett Garrett and Lydia Granville McVittie, and married Parker Canfield in 1939.

Canfield originally stood for office in the 1966 provincial election in 1st Queens, but failed against incumbent Frank Myers. She then stood again in the 1970 election, and was successful. She was reelected in the 1974 election and the 1978 election, but was defeated in the 1979 election.

From October 10, 1972 to May 2, 1974, she served as Minister without Portfolio and Minister responsible for the PEI Housing Authority in the government of Alex Campbell.

Following her death in 2000, the Government of Canada announced in 2005 that a new federal office building in Charlottetown would be named the Jean Canfield Building. The building officially opened in 2007.

References

External links
 Jean Canfield at Collections Canada
  Ella Jean Canfield

1919 births
2000 deaths
Members of the Executive Council of Prince Edward Island
People from Queens County, Prince Edward Island
Prince Edward Island Liberal Party MLAs
Women MLAs in Prince Edward Island
20th-century Canadian women politicians
Women government ministers of Canada
20th-century Canadian legislators